The 123rd Aviation Regiment was a regiment of the United States Army Aviation Branch.

In the late 1980s 1st Battalion, 123rd Aviation was operating in Panama.

References 

 

Aviation regiments of the United States Army
Military units and formations established in the 1980s